= The Linnet and the Eagle =

Native American mythological tale

The Linnet and the Eagle is a Native American myth. The origin is from the custom of adding eagle feathers to decorate their warriors.
